Scream Queens may refer to:

Scream Queens (2008 TV series), an American reality series
Scream Queens (2015 TV series), an American comedy horror series

See also 
 Scream queen
 Scream, Queen! My Nightmare on Elm Street, a 2019 American documentary film